Santiago Cáseres (born 25 February 1997) is an Argentine professional footballer who plays as a defensive midfielder for Argentine club Vélez Sarfield.

Career

Vélez Sarsfield
Cáseres made his professional debut for Vélez Sarsfield entering the field in a 0–3 defeat to Newell's Old Boys, for the 2016–17 Argentine Primera División. The team's coach at the time was Omar De Felippe.

The midfielder became a regular starter for Vélez during the 2017–18 Argentine Primera División. Due to his strong performances, at the end of the first semester of the season Cáseres was linked with a possible move to Atlético Madrid, reportedly willing to pay his buyout clause of USD 12 million.

Villarreal
Cáseres signed a five-year contract with Villarreal CF on 16 July 2018.

Club América
On 29 January 2020, Cáseres joined Liga MX side Club América on a one year loan agreement up to December 31, 2020 with the option for a permanent deal.

Vélez Sarfield 
On 22 February 2021, Cáseres returned to Argentina to Primera División side Vélez Sarfield, on a loan deal until December 2021. Cáseres signed a contract with Vélez Sarfield until December 2024 for $2.36 Million.

Career statistics

Club

References

External links
Profile at Vélez Sarsfield's official website 

Living people
1997 births
Argentine footballers
Argentine expatriate footballers
Association football midfielders
Footballers from Buenos Aires
Club Atlético Vélez Sarsfield footballers
Villarreal CF players
Club América footballers
Argentine Primera División players
La Liga players
Liga MX players
Expatriate footballers in Spain
Expatriate footballers in Mexico
Argentine expatriate sportspeople in Spain
Argentine expatriate sportspeople in Mexico